Distorsomina is a genus of medium-sized sea snails, marine gastropod mollusks in the family Cymatiidae. The only species within the genus Distorsomina is Distorsomina pusilla.

References

Cymatiidae
Monotypic gastropod genera